The 1954 New Zealand Royal Visit Honours were appointments by Elizabeth II to the Royal Victorian Order, to mark her visit to New Zealand in the summer of 1953–1954. During her visit, she visited 46 towns and cities. The honours were announced between 15 January and 29 January 1954.

The recipients of honours are displayed here as they were styled before their new honour.

Royal Victorian Order

Knight Grand Cross (GCVO)
 Lieutenant-General Sir (Charles) Willoughby (Moke) Norrie  – governor-general and commander-in-chief of New Zealand

Knight Commander (KCVO)
 William Alexander Bodkin   – of Alexandra

Commander (CVO)
 Eric Henry Compton – commissioner, New Zealand Police Force; of Wellington
 David Emmet Fouhy  – of Wellington
 Arthur Grant Harper – of Wellington
 Major Michael Augustus Tulk Trasenster – 4th/7th Royal Dragoon Guards; of Wellington

Member, fourth class (MVO)
 Clement Anthony Furlong – of Wellington
 Percy James Nalder – assistant commissioner, New Zealand Police Force; of Wellington

In 1984, Members of the Royal Victorian Order, fourth class, were redesignated as Lieutenants of the Royal Victorian Order (LVO).

Member, fifth class (MVO)
 Inspector Willis Spencer Brown – New Zealand Police Force; of Wellington
 Squadron Leader John Te Herekiekie Grace – Royal New Zealand Air Force; of Wellington
 Major Noel Rodney Ingle – New Zealand Military Forces; of Trentham
 Betty Nora Manning – of Wellington
 William Laurie Middlemass – of Auckland
 Patrick Jerad O'Dea – of Lower Hutt
 Peter John Hope Purvis  – of Wellington
 Flight Lieutenant Bruce William Thomas Richards  – Royal New Zealand Air Force; of Wellington
 Squadron Leader Cyril Laurence Siegert  – Royal New Zealand Air Force; of Whenuapai
 William Graham Taylor – of Wellington
 Captain Henry Campbell Walker  – New Zealand National Airways Corporation; of Lower Hutt
 Charles Henry Williams – of Wellington

Royal Victorian Medal

Silver (RVM)
 John Baxendale – of Auckland
 Allan Stewart Dawson – of Wellington
 Detective Sergeant Alan Robertson Grant – New Zealand Police Force; of Christchurch
 John Nathaniel George Mounsey – of Auckland
 Warrant Officer First Class Albert Edward Naulls  – New Zealand Army; of Wellington
 Henry Richard Rump – of Wellington
 Horace Joseph Stevenson – of Wellington

References

1954 awards
Royal Visit Honours
Monarchy in New Zealand